Manitou is a town in Tillman County, Oklahoma, United States. The population was 181 at the 2010 census.  It includes the former town of Siboney, absorbed on January 28, 1908.

Geography
Manitou is located at  (34.507930, -98.980859).

Lake Frederick is approximately seven miles east.

Demographics

As of the census of 2000, there were 278 people, 84 households, and 57 families residing in the town. There were 111 housing units at an average density of 352.6 per square mile (138.2/km2). The racial makeup of the town was 81.29% White, 8.99% African American, 3.60% Native American, 0.36% Asian, 0.36% Pacific Islander, 1.08% from other races, and 4.32% from two or more races. Hispanic or Latino of any race were 7.91% of the population.

There were 84 households, out of which 31.0% had children under the age of 18 living with them, 56.0% were married couples living together, 8.3% had a female householder with no husband present, and 32.1% were non-families. 31.0% of all households were made up of individuals, and 17.9% had someone living alone who was 65 years of age or older. The average household size was 2.52 and the average family size was 3.21.

In the town, the population was spread out, with 44.2% under the age of 18, 5.8% from 18 to 24, 19.1% from 25 to 44, 18.7% from 45 to 64, and 12.2% who were 65 years of age or older. The median age was 25 years. For every 100 females, there were 167.3 males. For every 100 females age 18 and over, there were 93.8 males.

The median income for a household in the town was $33,036, and the median income for a family was $35,750. Males had a median income of $23,750 versus $12,321 for females. The per capita income for the town was $9,177. About 13.8% of families and 25.9% of the population were below the poverty line, including 47.8% of those under the age of eighteen and 16.0% of those 65 or over.

Transportation
Manitou is served by U.S. Route 183, and is the eastern terminus of  State Highway 5C.

Frederick Regional Airport (KFDR; FAA ID: FDR), with a 6099 x 150 ft. paved runway, is approximately 11 miles south of town. 

Commercial air transportation is available out of Lawton-Fort Sill Regional Airport, about 38 miles to the east, or the larger Will Rogers World Airport in Oklahoma City, about 121 miles northeast.

Government and infrastructure
The Southwest Oklahoma Juvenile Center of the Oklahoma Office of Juvenile Affairs is located in Manitou.

References

External links
 Manitou--Encyclopedia of Oklahoma History and Culture

Towns in Tillman County, Oklahoma
Towns in Oklahoma